Dhobley formerly known as Liboi-Somalia is a strategic border town located south-western Somalia's lower juba region and approximately 0.2 KM from the Kenya border.
Dhobley is a district in the Lower Juba region near the Kenya border, also known as Liboi in Somalia. It has 8 schools, three of which are high schools. The district is also rich in water and has about eight water wells and irrigates all the surrounding areas and a large number of livestock who come to the city during the drought. in the districts around Dhobley and in the region NFD.
Dhobley is also the second largest city in the Lower Juba region after Kismayo, the capital of the region Lower Juba.
Dhobley has all the following areas:
• | Diif Somali
• | Deg-ilima
• | Tabto
• | Hoosingoow
• | bilis qoqani, and many more.
The main sources of income in Dhobley are the livestock trade, cross-border trade such as currency exchange, and the Airport of the city, the transport tax between the two countries. ETC.

Populated places in Lower Juba
Populated places in Somalia
Kenya–Somalia border crossings